Manufacturers Building is a historic commercial building located at Rockingham, Richmond County, North Carolina.  It was built about 1904, and is a two-story, red brick commercial building.  It has a high hipped and slate covered roof.  The building served as the administrative offices for five of the most important textile mills in Richmond County—Pee Dee Manufacturing Company, Steele's Mills, Roberdel Mills, Midway Mills, and Hannah Pickett Mills.

It was listed on the National Register of Historic Places in 1979.

References

Commercial buildings on the National Register of Historic Places in North Carolina
Commercial buildings completed in 1904
Buildings and structures in Randolph County, North Carolina
National Register of Historic Places in Richmond County, North Carolina